Vasika... kalispera sas is a 1982 Greek comedy film directed by Giannis Dalianidis.

Cast 
 Stathis Psaltis - Stathis
 Panos Mihalopoulos - Panos
 Stamatis Gardelis - Denis
 Efi Pikoula - Betty
 Yorgos Rigas - Sotos
 Yannis Bostantzoglou - Kyriakos 
 Nikolaos Papadopoulos - Tzimis
 Sofia Aliberti - Lilian
 Kaiti Finou - Koula
 Rena Pagrati - Rena

References

External links 

1982 comedy films
1982 films
Greek comedy films
Films directed by Giannis Dalianidis